Turtles Can Fly is a 2004 Kurdish war drama film written, produced, and directed by Bahman Ghobadi. The film stars Soran Ebrahim, Avaz Latif, Saddam Hossein Faysal, Hiresh Feysal Rahman, Abdolrahman Karim, Ajil Zibari. The plot is about three refugee children, on the border of Iraq-Turkey, awaiting for the Americans to invade Iraq and the fall of Saddam Hussein.

Turtles Can Fly was the first film to be made after Saddam Hussein's fall in Iraq. It had its premiere at 2004 Toronto International Film Festival.

Plot
The film is set in the Kurdish refugee camp on the Iraq–Turkey border on the eve of the US invasion of Iraq. Thirteen-year-old Soran, known by the alias Kak Satellite, is known for his installation of dishes and antenna for the villages who are looking for news about Saddam Hussein, he is also known for his limited knowledge of the English language, which he learns because he interacts with the Americans when they invade. He is the dynamic, but manipulative leader of the children, organizing the dangerous but necessary sweeping and clearing of the minefields. Many of these children are injured one way or the other, yet still maintain a boisterous prattle whenever possible, devoted to their work in spite of the vagaries of their life.

The industrious Kak Satellite arranges trade-ins for undetonated mines. He falls for a girl named Agrin, an orphan from Halabja who has recently came to the refugee camps, assisting her whenever possible in order to win her over. She is a perpetual dour-faced girl who is part bitter, part lost in thought, unable to escape the demons of the past. She is traveling with her disabled but very caring brother Hengov, who has the gift of clairvoyance that made him have a bad reputation for it. The siblings stay with a blind toddler named Riga, who they introduce as their "little brother". It is later revealed that Agrin gave birth to Riga after she was gang raped by Ba'ath soldiers, while Hengov's arms had been shot as the soldiers attempted to drown both of them. Agrin is unable to accept Riga as anything besides a taint, a continuous reminder of her brutal past.

Agrin tries to abandon the child and commit suicide on multiple occasions. Once she tries to burn herself in the lake, but she gives up. Trying to get rid of the child, she ties him on a tree and abandons him. He walks around until he gets stuck in a minefield. Kak Satellite tries to rescue him but a mine blows on Kak Satellite, injuring his leg. After multiple tries, Agrin finally ties Riga to a rock and throws him to the bottom of the lake, afterwards committing suicide herself by jumping from a cliff. When her brother sees a vision of his loved ones drowning, he hurries out of the tent to save them, but he is too late. Hengov eventually finds his nephew's body at the bottom of the lake but can't cut it loose from the rock due to his disability. Hengov grieves on the cliff from where Agrin jumped to her death. Meanwhile, a disabled Kak Satellite loses any charm he had about the American intervention and looks away when the American soldiers finally pass by him.

Cast

Reception

Critical response
On the review aggregator Rotten Tomatoes, the film holds an approval rating of 88% based on 73 reviews, with an average rating of 7.70/10. The site's critical consensus reads "Set in Iraq after the fall of Saddam, Turtles Can Fly is being hailed as extraordinary, moving, and lyrical." On Metacritic, the film has a weighted average score of 85 out of 100, based on 31 critics, indicating "universal acclaim".

Film critic Roger Ebert gave the film four out of four stars, describing the film's story as "the actual lives of refugees, who lack the luxury of opinions because they are preoccupied with staying alive in a world that has no place for them". David Sterritt of The Christian Science Monitor praised the film saying, "Superb acting and authentic details energize this rare Iran/Iraq coproduction.". Michael Koresky of IndieWire praised the film writing, "Rarely does a film feel this urgent, like a message in a bottle accidentally washed ashore."

The film was included in the list of best war movies of all time by Jacob Osborn and Megan Drillinger of News Channel Nebraska, where it was placed on the 35th position.

Awards
 Special Mention by the Youth Jury, Berlin International Film Festival, 2005
 Golden Seashell, Best Film, San Sebastián International Film Festival, 2004
 Special Jury Prize, Chicago International Film Festival, 2004
 International Jury and Audience Awards, São Paulo International Film Festival, 2004
 La Pieza Award, Best Film, Mexico City International Contemporary Film Festival, 2005
 Audience Award, Rotterdam International Film Festival, 2005
 Golden Prometheus, Best Film, Tbilisi International Film Festival, 2005
 Aurora Award, Tromsø International Film Festival, 2005
 Golden Butterfly, Isfahan International Festival of Films for Children, 2004
 Gold Dolphin, Festróia - Tróia International Film Festival, 2005
 Sundance Selection, 2005
 Silver Skeleton Award Harvest Moonlight Festival 2007

In popular culture
The film had an influence on the 2007-2009 Gundam anime series Mobile Suit Gundam 00. The anime's main protagonist Setsuna F. Seiei is a war orphan of Kurdish origins and his real name is Soran Ibrahim, a reference to the child actor portraying the protagonist of Turtles Can Fly. The film was sampled by Jay Electronica in his 2007 mixtape Act I: Eternal Sunshine (The Pledge).

See also 
 Kurdish Cinema

References

Further reading

External links
 
 
 
 
 

2004 films
2000s war drama films
Iraqi drama films
French war drama films
Kurdish films
Kurdish-language films
Films directed by Bahman Ghobadi
Films about orphans
Films about suicide
Films set in 2003
Films set in Iraq
Films set in Turkey
Films shot in Iraq
2004 independent films
Iraq War films
French independent films
Iranian independent films
Iranian war drama films
2004 drama films
2000s French films